Soleymaniyeh may refer to:
 Soleymaniyeh, Kerman
 Soleymaniyeh, Rafsanjan, Kerman Province
 Soleymaniyeh, Kermanshah
 Soleymaniyeh, Sonqor, Kermanshah Province
 Soleymaniyeh, Razavi Khorasan
 Soleymaniyeh-ye Pa'in, Razavi Khorasan Province
 Soleymaniyeh, Nishapur, Razavi Khorasan Province
 Soleymaniyeh Palace, in Tehran

See also
 Sulaymaniyah (disambiguation)
 Süleymaniye (disambiguation)